The 1959 Davidson Wildcats football team represented Davidson College as a member of the Southern Conference (SoCon) during the 1959 NCAA University Division football season. Led by eighth-year head coach Bill Dole, the Wildcats compiled an overall record of 1–8 with a mark of 0–5 in conference play, tying for eighth in the SoCon.

Schedule

References

Davidson
Davidson Wildcats football seasons
Davidson Wildcats football